is the eleventh single by Japanese music trio Candies. Written by Haruo Hayashi and Koichi Sugiyama, the single was released on September 1, 1976.

The song peaked at No. 17 on Oricon's singles chart and sold over 90,000 copies.

Track listing 
All lyrics are written by Haruo Hayashi; all music is composed by Koichi Sugiyama; all music is arranged by Motoki Funayama.

Chart positions

References

External links 
 

1976 singles
1976 songs
Japanese-language songs
Candies (group) songs
Sony Music Entertainment Japan singles